The Yaroslavl electoral district was a constituency created for the 1917 Russian Constituent Assembly election. The electoral district covered the Yaroslavl Governorate.

In Yaroslavl town the Bolsheviks obtained 13,974 votes, Kadets 7,268 votes, SRs 3,303 and Mensheviks 2,853.

Results

References

Electoral districts of the Russian Constituent Assembly election, 1917
Yaroslavl Governorate